Cassville may refer to several places in the United States:

Cassville, Georgia
Cassville, Indiana
Cassville, Missouri
Cassville, New York
Cassville, Pennsylvania
Cassville, West Virginia
Cassville, Wisconsin, village
Cassville (town), Wisconsin

See also
 List of places named for Lewis Cass